Northumberland Ferries Limited (NFL) is a ferry company operating in eastern Canada and headquartered in Charlottetown, Prince Edward Island. NFL is also the owner of subsidiary Bay Ferries Limited (which used to include the Bay Ferries Great Lakes brand) through its holding company.

Wood Islands–Caribou Ferry

NFL has operated the ferry service that carries the Trans-Canada Highway across the eastern part of the Northumberland Strait between Wood Islands, Prince Edward Island and Caribou, Nova Scotia since it was established in 1941 by the Government of Canada. This service is seasonal and only operates between the months of May and December on account of heavy sea ice and the lack of icebreaking ferries.  NFL also operates the ferry terminals in Wood Islands and Caribou, both of which are owned by the Government of Canada.

Until 2022, NFL operated two vessels owned by the Government of Canada: Confederation built in 1993, and Holiday Island built in 1971.  On July 22, 2022, Holiday Island suffered a fire causing ferry crossings to be cancelled. The MV Saaremaa 1 was loaned by the Société des traversiers du Québec as a temporary replacement, and began operations on August 20, 2022.  While Confederation has been operated exclusively by NFL since she was built, Holiday Island joined NFL in 1997 after being declared surplus by previous operator Marine Atlantic (who operated the vessel between Cape Tormentine, New Brunswick and Borden-Carleton, Prince Edward Island) upon completion of the Confederation Bridge.  Following the 2022 fire, Holiday Island was declared by Transport Canada to be beyond repair and would be scrapped.

Fares are paid only when exiting Prince Edward Island.  The other major crossing of the Northumberland Strait, the Confederation Bridge from Prince Edward Island to New Brunswick, does likewise.  Therefore, travellers entering the island on the ferry and exiting on the bridge or vice versa only need pay for one of the links.

As an interprovincial ferry service, the route qualifies for a federal subsidy which is provided to NFL to offset losses in return for operating the vessels and terminals. This subsidy was fully renewed for 5 years in March 2005.

Transport Canada had initially proposed a reduction in funding to permit operation between the months of May and October only, and after 2008 the service was to be reduced to only one vessel. The proposed service changes raised protests in both Prince Edward Island and Nova Scotia by residents and politicians, forcing the federal government to maintain the status quo until March 2010.

In December 2009 it was reported that Transport Canada was considering only renewing the subsidy for 1 year to cover the 2010 operating season, after which it had been speculated that the federal government would reduce or eliminate the operating subsidy for future years.  This would have likely resulted in the retirement of the MV Holiday Island and the reduction to a 1-vessel service from July–September, or possibly the complete abandonment of the ferry service after 2011.  Residents of Nova Scotia and Prince Edward Island lobbied federal and local politicians and bureaucrats to see the 2-vessel May–December service maintained and enhanced as an alternative to the Confederation Bridge in the event of a disaster forcing closure of the span.

In 2014, the federal government announced it was committed to maintaining an operating subsidy until at least 2016, with some funding specifically directed at modernizing mechanical systems on the Holiday Island.

Terminals

Caribou 

This terminal serves Nova Scotia, and is located at the North end of Highway 106, a spur route of the Trans-Canada Highway. The terminal was constructed following the formation of Northumberland Ferries in 1941, and has received numerous upgrades since its construction. At the time of opening, the ferry was only accessible via Three Brooks Road. During the Canada-wide construction of the Trans-Canada Highway in the 1960s, Highway 106 was built providing the service with direct access to the national highway network. At this time, the terminal was expanded to handle more vehicle traffic due to the opening of the highway. A new terminal building was constructed in the early 1970s, and is still used today. The terminal also received a major upgrade including new docking infrastructure, terminal renovations, vehicle lanes and parking prior to the 1993 introduction of the high capacity MV Confederation, which is significantly larger than the other ferries running at the time.

Wood Islands 

This terminal serves Prince Edward Island, and is located at the east end of Route 1, the Trans Canada Highway, and is adjacent to Wood Islands Provincial Park. Like the Caribou terminal, it was constructed following the formation of Northumberland ferries in 1941. During the early 1990s, the terminal received a major upgrade, including a completely new terminal building and docking infrastructure to accommodate MV Confederation. The terminal building received renovations in 2017 which saw the interior modernized, and includes televisions and new seating areas. The previous terminal still stands today, located on the opposite side of the vehicle lanes from the current terminal, and is used for storage.

Historical Fleet 
 MV Prince Nova (1941-1958), formerly MV Erie Isle where she operated on Lake Erie from Leamington, Ontario to Pelee Island.  She was purchased by NFL and entered service in 1941, serving until 1958 with arrival of MV Lord Selkirk.  Laid up in Pictou where she caught fire and burnt at wharf later that year.  Scrapped on site.
 SS Charles A. Dunning (1941, 1946–1964), formerly SS Sankaty where she operated in Massachusetts and Maine.  She was purchased by NFL but before entering service was requisitioned for service in the Royal Canadian Navy for minelaying duty as HMCS Sankaty.  Returned to NFL in 1946, serving until 1964 with arrival of MV Prince Nova.  Sold for scrap but sank en route to Sydney.
 MV Lord Selkirk (1958-1993), built for Government of Canada by Ferguson Industries, Pictou in 1958, serving until 1993 with arrival of MV Confederation.  Sold to company in Panama. Used in Chiriqui Grande in Panama up to the moment the road was built. At present lying at anchor at Chiriqui Grande in poor condition (July 2014).
 MV Confederation (1975-1993), built for Government of Canada by Halifax Shipyards, Halifax in 1962 where she was operated by CN from Borden, Prince Edward Island to Cape Tormentine, New Brunswick.  Still owned by Government of Canada, she was transferred in 1975 to NFL from CN, serving until 1993 with arrival of MV Confederation.  Sold in 1994 to shipping line Groupe Desgagnés, Quebec, refitted and renamed Nordik Passeur for service from Riviere au Renard, Quebec to Havre St. Pierre, Quebec via Anticosti Island.  Mothballed in 1997, she was scrapped in Turkey in 2007.
 MV Prince Nova (1963-1997), built for Government of Canada by Ferguson Industries, Pictou in 1963, serving until 1997 with arrival of MV Holiday Island.  Sold to Cross Sound Ferry, New London in 1998, refitted and renamed the MV Susan Anne for service across Long Island Sound.  Currently operating.
 MV Prince Edward (1972-1997), built for the Government of Canada by Ferguson Industries, Pictou in 1972, serving until 1997 with arrival of MV Holiday Island.  Sold to Government of Newfoundland and Labrador in 1997, refitted and renamed the MV Captain Earl W. Windsor for service to Fogo Island and the Change Islands.  Currently operating.

References

The History of Northumberland Ferries, by Troy Cock, part of The Stories of Caribou, edited by Olive Prest Pastor, 1992
Northumberland Ferries Limited
PEI Ship Arrivals

Ferry companies of Prince Edward Island
Ferry companies of Nova Scotia
Companies based in Charlottetown
Transport in Pictou County
Transport in Queens County, Prince Edward Island
Transport companies established in 1941
Canadian companies established in 1941